Nicholas O. Tiron (died 1306 × 1307), Abbot of Arbroath and Bishop of Dunblane, was a late 13th-century and early 14th-century churchman in the Kingdom of Scotland. Little is known about Nicholas until he appeared on 21 November 1299, holding the position of Abbot of Arbroath in a charter of that abbey; the last attestation of his predecessor Henry can be dated to 16 October 1296, so that Nicholas must have become abbot sometime in between these two dates.

As Abbot of Arbroath, he was a canon of Dunblane Cathedral, and entitled to participate in episcopal elections. Bishop Alpín had died sometime between 1 October 1299 and 15 October 1301, and the new election to the bishopric became deadlocked.

Several canons had emerged as candidates, and it seems to have been decided that all candidates should proceed to the papal see to request judgment from the Pope. As it happened, Abbot Nicholas was the only candidate to travel to the papacy; as Cockburn commented, "An abbot could face the heavy expense; no poor canon of the Cathedral could". When no other turned up, the Pope authorised Nicholas' provision, and he was consecrated by Theodoric, Bishop of Palestrina, on 13 November 1301.

Nicholas' short career as bishop is not well recorded. In the events of the early Wars of Scottish Independence, Nicholas' role is unclear and aside from some appearances in the charters of Coupar Angus Abbey, his name is largely absent from the evidence. He appears for the last time, in papal documents, on 26 January 1306 and was dead a good time before 11 December 1307, when his successor Nicholas de Balmyle was consecrated as bishop in France.

Notes

References

 Cockburn, James Hutchison, The Medieval Bishops of Dunblane and Their Church, (Edinburgh, 1959)
 Dowden, John, The Bishops of Scotland, ed. J. Maitland Thomson, (Glasgow, 1912)
 Watt, D. E. R., A Biographical Dictionary of Scottish Graduates to A. D. 1410, (Oxford, 1977)
 Watt, D. E. R., & Murray, A. L., Fasti Ecclesiae Scotinanae Medii Aevi ad annum 1638, Revised Edition, (Edinburgh, 2003)
 Watt, D. E .R., & Shead, N. F. (eds.), The Heads of Religious Houses in Scotland from the 12th to the 16th Centuries (The Scottish Records Society, New Series, Volume 24), (Edinburgh, 2001)

13th-century births
1300s deaths
Abbots of Arbroath
Bishops of Dunblane
13th-century Scottish Roman Catholic priests
14th-century Scottish Roman Catholic bishops
People of the Wars of Scottish Independence